The 1995 Georgia Southern Eagles football team represented Georgia Southern University as a member of the Southern Conference (SoCon) during the 1995 NCAA Division I-AA football season. Led by Tim Stowers in his sixth and final season as head coach, the Eagles compiled an overall record of 9–4 with a conference mark of 5–3, trying for third place in the SoCon. Georgia Southern advanced to the NCAA Division I-AA Football Championship playoffs, where they beat Troy State in the first round before falling to eventual national champion Montana in the quarterfinals. The Eagles played their home games at Paulson Stadium in Statesboro, Georgia.

Schedule

References

Georgia Southern
Georgia Southern Eagles football seasons
Georgia Southern Eagles football